Gordoncillo, is a municipality located in the province of León, Castile and León, Spain. At the time of the 2010 census (INE), the municipality had a population of 499 inhabitants.

It is well known for its Tierra de León (D.O) wines.

References

Municipalities in the Province of León